Old Live Oak Cemetery is a historic cemetery in Selma, Alabama founded in 1829 and expanded in 1877. The newer portion is sometimes called New Live Oak Cemetery and the cemetery is collectively known as Live Oak Cemetery. It contains burials of Confederate States of America leaders, as well Benjamin Sterling Turner, a formerly enslaved African-American who served as U.S. Representative for Alabama during the Reconstruction era.

Famous burials
 William R. King (1786–1853) 13th Vice-president of the United States. Historians have speculated that King was likely the first gay U.S. vice president and possibly one of the first gay members of the U.S. House of Representatives and the U.S. Senate. A lifelong bachelor, King lived for 15 years in the home of future U.S. president James Buchanan while the two served in the Senate. Buchanan, also a lifelong bachelor, is believed by some historians to be the nation's first gay president.
 John Tyler Morgan (1824–1907) CSA General, then six-term U.S. senator after the war. An ardent racist and ex-slave holder, advocate for Jim Crow laws and racial segregation
 Robert W. Barnswell (1849–1902) Episcopal Bishop of Alabama
 Benjamin Sterling Turner (1825-1894) The first African American U.S. Congressman from Alabama. Turner was born into slavery in North Carolina and taken to Selma by his owner as a child. He remained enslaved until the end of the Civil War. Turner spent much of his congressional career seeking financial aid for his broken southern state. He advocated racially mixed schools and financial reparation for former slaves; more than a century and a half later, both issues remain controversial.

Confederate Circle 
The graves of soldiers are to the south of the Confederate Soldier Monument, with cannons pointing north, symbolically threatening the United States and protecting the deceased traitors.  Elodie Todd Dawson, buried nearby, was head of the Ladies Memorial Association (later the United Daughters of the Confederacy) and spearheaded the effort to build the $5,500 Confederate Monument in the cemetery and move 155 Confederate soldiers' bodies to the monument. The United Daughters of the Confederacy were responsible for spreading the myth of the Lost Cause of the Confederacy, which claims the cause of the Confederate States during the American Civil War was just, heroic, and not centered on slavery. The Lost Cause Myth is a whitewashing of history that frames the war as a defense of states' rights, and as necessary to protect their agrarian economy against supposed Northern aggression. Modern historians overwhelmingly disagree with these characterizations, noting that the central cause of the war was slavery.

Other Confederate monuments
Jefferson Davis Memorial Chair unusually in the form of a carved stone chair
Forrest Memorial (2000) inscribed in part "Defender of Selma, Wizard of the Saddle, Untutored Genius, The First with the Most, This Monument stands as a testament of our perpetual devotion and respect for Lt Gen. Nathan Bedford Forrest ... One of the South's finest heroes." After the Civil War, Forrest founded the Ku Klux Klan (KKK) in 1867. He was the first "Grand Wizard" of the white terrorist organization. The KKK, with Forrest at the lead, suppressed voting rights of blacks in the South through violence and intimidation during Reconstruction. During his time in the Confederate army he committed atrocities at Ft. Pillow in Tennessee, where in April 1864 troops under his command massacred hundreds of U.S. troops who had already surrendered.

Elodie Todd Dawson Monument
The Elodie Todd Dawson Monument marks the graves of Elodie Todd Dawson (April 1, 1844 – November 14, 1881) and her husband Confederate Col. Nathaniel H. R. Dawson (1829–1895). Elodie Todd Dawson was the half-sister of Mary Todd Lincoln the wife of President Abraham Lincoln.

After the war Nathaniel Dawson was appointed U.S. Commissioner of Education, the first from Alabama. Nathaniel Dawson also served as a member of the Alabama legislature which included serving as Speaker of the House. He was an organizer in the Democratic Party.  Dawson was considered a leading citizen of Selma who raised money for Selma's Charity Hospital and Dallas Academy.  He was a church leader at St. Paul's Episcopal Church, where his funeral was held.

In 2015, the Elodie Todd Dawson sculpture was named one of Alabama's "most photographed cemetery monuments".

The Pigeon House 
A structure also called the Spring House for when it was used, sits near the Confederate Soldier Monument.  The unusual name arises from the gables that were designed as bird houses, since closed to preserve the structure. The building was used for Confederate Memorial Day band concerts and programs each Spring. It is now used for storage.

See also

 List of Confederate monuments and memorials

References

External links
 
 
 
 Library of Congress – Cemetery
Cemeteries in Alabama
Selma, Alabama